William Edward Koenig (born August 17, 1956) is an American prelate of the Roman Catholic Church who has been serving as the tenth bishop of the Diocese of Wilmington in Delaware since 2021.

Biography

Early life 
William Koenig was born on August 17, 1955, in Queens, New York.  Koenig grew up in  East Meadow, New York, attending St. Raphael’s Elementary School.He later attended St. Pius X Preparatory Seminary in Uniondale, New York, Cathedral College of the Immaculate Conception in Douglaston, New York and the Seminary of the Immaculate Conception in Huntington, New York.

Priesthood 
On May 14, 1983, Koenig was ordained to the priesthood for the Diocese of Rockville Centre by Bishop John R. McGann at St. Agnes Cathedral in Rockville Centre, New York.

After being ordained, Koenig obtained a Master of Social Work degree from Fordham University in New York City  At the same time, he served as a pastor in St. Edward the Confessor Parish in Syosset, New York.  In 2008, Koenig was assigned for one year to St. James Parish in Setauket, New York.  During his time in Setauket, Koenig also worked in the Campus Ministry Program at State University at Stony Brook in Stony Brook, New York.

In 1989, Koenig became diocesan director of vocations at the cathedral residence of the Immaculate Conception in Douglaston, New York, helping in the formation of seminarians.  In 1990, he also became diocesan director of ministry to priests.In 2000, Koenig was named as parochial vicar at St. Agnes Cathedral Parish and pastor of St. William the Abbot Parish in Seaford, New York, serving there until 2009.  In 2007, he was named chaplain to his holiness by Pope Benedict XVI.  In 2009, Koenig became rector of St. Agnes Cathedral and in 2020 vicar for clergy for the diocese.

Bishop of Wilmington 
On April 30, 2021, Pope Francis appointed Koenig bishop for the Diocese of Wilmington. Koenig was consecrated by Archbishop William Lori on July 13, 2021, at the Church of St. Elizabeth, in his new diocese. He was asked in 2021 if he would give communion to President Joe Biden even though Biden supports abortion rights for women and same-sex marriage.  Koenig said that he would willingly discuss Catholic teaching with him.

See also

 Catholic Church hierarchy
 Catholic Church in the United States
 Historical list of the Catholic bishops of the United States
 List of Catholic bishops of the United States
 Lists of patriarchs, archbishops, and bishops

References

External links
Roman Catholic Diocese of Wilmington Official Site
Roman Catholic Diocese of Rockville Centre Official Site

Episcopal succession

1956 births
Living people
People from Queens, New York
American Roman Catholic priests
Bishops appointed by Pope Francis